The Callisto Protocol is a 2022 survival horror action video game developed by Striking Distance Studios and published by Krafton. It is directed by Dead Space series co-creator Glen Schofield, and is considered a spiritual successor to the series. The game's story follows Jacob Lee (Josh Duhamel) who is sent to a prison facility set on the Jovian moon Callisto fighting against infected prisoners with an unknown disease while uncovering dark secrets of the facility. Gameplay has players exploring a series of levels, garnering resources while fighting off infected prisoners.

Development of the game began with the formation of Striking Distance Studios in June 2019. Originally developed as a game set in the PUBG: Battlegrounds universe, it later evolved into an original intellectual property.

The game was released for PlayStation 4, PlayStation 5, Windows, Xbox One, and Xbox Series X/S on December 2, 2022. It received mixed reviews. The game failed to meet the sales expectations of Krafton.

Gameplay 
In The Callisto Protocol, players assume the role of Jacob Lee from a third-person perspective. Jacob's health is indicated by an implant on the back of his neck called a "C.O.R.E. Device". Health can be replenished with injectable packs found throughout levels. Jacob can use weapons to combat enemies, as well as a melee system to dodge enemy attacks while looking for openings to strike and kill them. Both combat styles can be mixed up, providing greater variety when facing enemy types. Jacob can collect and review audio logs during gameplay.

Plot 
In 2320, Jacob Lee (Josh Duhamel) and Max Barrow (Jeff Schine) are contract freight transporters working for the United Jupiter Company (UJC). The two decide to retire after ferrying one last shipment between Europa and the UJC-operated Black Iron Prison on Callisto. Shortly after leaving Black Iron in their ship, the Charon, they are boarded by the Outer Way, a terrorist group purportedly responsible for a massive biological attack on Europa, and the ship crash-lands back on Callisto. Max is killed, leaving Jacob and Outer Way leader Dani Nakamura (Karen Fukuhara) as the only survivors. Both are recovered by Black Iron Prison security head Captain Leon Ferris (Sam Witwer) and incarcerated on the orders of Warden Duncan Cole (James C. Mathis III). After an intake process, Jacob awakens to find the prison overrun by hostile "biophages"; inmates afflicted with an unknown disease. He encounters Elias Porter (Zeke Alton), a prisoner who claims to have an escape plan. After freeing Elias, Jacob fights and leaves Ferris to die at the hands of biophages.

Elias convinces Jacob to locate a hacker in the Special Housing Unit (SHU) to summon a ship for their escape. The hacker is revealed to be Dani, but she refuses to join them. At the hangar, Jacob and Elias are intercepted by a partially-infected Ferris and are ejected onto Callisto's surface; Elias suffers fatal injuries in the process. Dani appears in a half-track and recovers Elias' memories of Black Iron and decides to assist Jacob as the biophages mutate and become more dangerous. After Dani fails to find evidence of the UJC illegally smuggling bioweapons in the wreckage of Charon, the two make it to the hangar where they summon a ship. Cole intervenes and shoots down the ship, causing it to crash into and destroy the hangar.

With their method of escape gone, Jacob and Dani decide to confront Cole. The two make their way through the ruins of Arcas, Callisto's original colony before it was abandoned and the Black Iron Prison built over it. They find a lab holding a dead creature that the original Arcas miners unearthed, and learn the biophages originated from larvae that were found in the creature. Seeing its potential for accelerating evolution, the UJC harvested the creature's larvae and began experimenting with it on humans, causing an outbreak in Arcas; one biophage, Subject Zero, retained his intelligence before the UJC destroyed the colony. After Jacob and Dani fend off an encounter with Ferris, Dani becomes infected. Returning to Black Iron, Jacob is knocked out by a security robot and imprisoned.

Jacob is freed by the prison doctor, Dr. Caitlyn Mahler (Louise Barnes), who instructs him to meet her at her lab. She reveals that Cole is part of a religious sect called Kallipolis, with the organization attempting to find a way to advance human evolution. He ordered Mahler to experiment on Black Iron prisoners to find a subject compatible with the alien infection and replicate Subject Zero with a Subject Alpha. Mahler tells Jacob that Dani can be cured by extracting the Alpha's DNA to synthesize an antidote. When Jacob inquires about the Europa outbreak, Mahler admits that a diluted version of the infection was released; the incident inspired Cole to initiate the Callisto Protocol, causing an outbreak in Black Iron by releasing Mahler's test subjects to create the Alpha. Mahler provides Jacob access to Dani's memories, where Jacob learns that Dani's sister was killed in the Europa outbreak. He recovers his own memories showing he was aware that the UJC was using his ship to smuggle alien larva samples, but he remained willfully ignorant due to the payments he was receiving. 

Jacob confronts Cole, who pits him against Ferris, now mutated into the Alpha. Jacob defeats and extracts Ferris' DNA. Cole attempts to convince Jacob to turn over the DNA, asserting its value in safeguarding humanity's survival, but Jacob uses it to cure Dani. Enraged, Cole activates the prison's self-destruct countdown and boasts that he has gathered enough data to carry out the Protocol. Jacob puts Dani in the last remaining escape pod along with an alien larva sample, giving her the evidence she needs to expose the UJC's experiments. Mahler contacts Jacob and informs him of a possible escape as the self-destruct was temporarily postponed, but before he could act on this he is attacked by Ferris.

Development 
The origins of The Callisto Protocol began with the formation of Striking Distance as a studio within PUBG Corporation (now PUBG Studios) in June 2019, helmed by Glen Schofield, who had previously co-created the Dead Space series at Visceral Games. The studio was created to expand the PUBG: Battlegrounds universe by creating a narrative driven game. Schofield said that when he met with PUBG Corporation where they explained their goal to expand the PUBG narrative, he already had the concept for The Callisto Protocol in mind and presented that to them and worked with them to fit his idea into their universe. However, by May 2022, Schofield stated that the game had grown to be its own story and is no longer connected to PUBG, though there remain small nods to the latter.

Schofield wanted to keep the game grounded in reality to some degree, and thus selected a potentially human-colonizable location like Callisto as the setting. The moon has been theorized to have a subsurface ocean of water, which Schofield believed could offer a mystery to tie into the game.

Among others working on the game include Steve Papoutsis, who co-developed the Dead Space series and led the series following Schofield's departure from Visceral; Scott Whitney, a designer on the Dead Space series; and Christopher Stone, the animation director for the former series. Of the 150 employees of Striking Distance, Schofield said that about 25 to 30 former coworkers from Visceral Games and Sledgehammer Games are part of Striking Distance worked on The Callisto Protocol. Several journalists commented on thematic and gameplay similarities to the Dead Space series. The game appears to include the same type of diegetic interface that Dead Space had used by a holographic indicator on the back of the prisoner's neck that indicates their health status and other attributes to the player. Schofield said that the comparisons to Dead Space reflect on his style of game, and while he still wanted to create something different, the allusions and inspiration from Dead Space fell out naturally from his creative approach. Josh Duhamel provides the voice and motion capture for main protagonist Jacob Lee. At Comic-Con 2022, it was revealed that Karen Fukuhara and Sam Witwer joined the cast. Fukuhara plays Dani Nakamura, leader of the resistance group The Outer Way, while Witwer portrayed Leon Ferris, the captain of the Prison Guard. In addition to providing voices, the cast performed with motion capture technology. Fukuhara commented that, prior to acting in motion capture, the development team would "show us what the room would look like on artwork that they had done". 

The Callisto Protocol was designed for the newer home game consoles, the PlayStation 5 and the Xbox Series X and Series S, in addition to other platforms. Schofield stated his intent was "really trying to make the scariest game on next-gen platforms" in the same way that Dead Space had been considered on its release for the PlayStation 3 and Xbox 360. He stated that the game takes advantage of new lighting techniques and 3D audio systems offered by the new consoles, as well as haptic feedback that the PlayStation 5's DualSense controller provides, to create deep immersion for the player in the game. Striking Distance Studios Chief Technical Officer Mark James said the game was developed with "maximum realism" in mind. It uses Unreal Engine 4. Krafton and Striking Distance have partnered with Skybound Entertainment for release of the game, as Skybound sees potential for additional multimedia opportunities beyond the video game for the concept.

In September 2022, Schofield released a tweet outlining development on the game that some interpreted as a glorification of crunch culture. This led to online backlash, including from Bloomberg reporter Jason Schreier, who has reported on crunch culture in the past. Schofield later deleted the tweet and issued an apology. In an interview with Inverse, Schofield took responsibility for crunching his staff, and promised that crunch is "not a thing that happens in our next project or any future project."

The game's development and marketing costs was reported to be 200 billion Won (£132m/ US$161.5m).

Release 
On October 27, 2022, the Japanese release was canceled when the game did not get a CERO rating due to the game's violent content and the developer refused to make the necessary changes. The game was released for PlayStation 4, PlayStation 5, Windows, Xbox One, and Xbox Series X/S on December 2, 2022.

Reception 

The Callisto Protocol received "mixed or average" reviews, according to review aggregator Metacritic. Several publications noted that The Callisto Protocol suffered from stuttering and performance issues, primarily affecting the PC version; as a result, the game received "mostly negative" user reviews on Steam upon release. The same day, the game received an update that alleviated shader compilation stutter, with further optimization patches being promised by the developers. Glen Schofield later claimed that the technical issues were the result of a "clerical error" from the game's development team.

PCGamesN was highly positive of the game, feeling it excelled at balancing horror and action, though felt that the story was unremarkable.

Sales 

The Callisto Protocol was the sixth best-selling retail game in the UK in its week of release. The game failed to meet the sales expectations of Krafton, who expected sales of five million units, but lowered their estimate to reaching two million units sold within 2023; in response, investors in Krafton lowered their target stock prices.

Accolades 
The game was nominated for two awards at the 21st Visual Effects Society Awards.

References

External links 
 

2020s horror video games
2022 video games
Fiction set on Callisto (moon)
PlayStation 4 games
PlayStation 5 games
Science fiction horror video games
Science fiction video games
Single-player video games
Survival horror video games
Third-person shooters
Unreal Engine games
Video games developed in the United States
Video games about viral outbreaks
Video games set in outer space
Video games set in prison
Video games set in the 24th century
Windows games
Xbox One games
Xbox Series X and Series S games